Dae Insu, also known as King Seon (r. 818–830) was the 10th king of the kingdom of Balhae. He restored national strength, and is remembered today as the last of the great Balhae rulers before its fall.

Background 
Dae Insu was a 4th-generation descendant of Dae Joyeong's younger brother, Dae Ya-bal. In spite being from the collateral branch, he succeeded to the throne during the years of 817 and 818. He reestablished royal authority, and strengthened the military tremendously.

Reign 

King Seon concentrated heavily on the empire's territorial expansion, and led campaigns that resulted in the absorption of many northern Malgal tribes including Heishui Mohe. Southwest Little Goguryeo in Liaodong was absorbed into Balhae, and also he ordered southward expansion towards Silla.

During his 12-year reign, he dispatched embassies five times to Japan, which was aimed at establishing diplomatic relations as well as increasing trade between the two kingdoms. Balhae emissaries were treated favorably even though Japan wanted Balhae to restrict the size of the embassies due to the costs associated with hosting them. The trade routes established across the Sea of Japan led to Balhae becoming one of Japan's most important trading partners.

He died in 830 and his grandson Dae Ijin succeeded to the throne.

See also
List of Korean monarchs
History of Korea
List of Administrative divisions of Balhae

References

External links
 The extension of Balhae empire under King Mun and King Seon 
 The 5 capitals and the 16 prefectures of Balhae under King Seon reign in 820 

830 deaths
Balhae rulers
Mohe peoples
9th-century rulers in Asia
Year of birth unknown